Edmonton Nighthawks FC is a floorball club based in Edmonton, Alberta, Canada. It is one of three floorball clubs based in the province of Alberta, and is a member of the Alberta Floorball League (EFUL).

History
Founded in 2007, the E-Town Elite Floorball Club was the first floorball club in the province of Alberta, and one of only few in the entire country of Canada. In 2008, the club decided to take part in the inaugural EFUL season, and it played its first official match in 2009, against River City IBK.

For the 2009–10 season, the club has changed its name to Edmonton Nighthawks Floorball Club.

Roster
As of October 3, 2009

See also
Edmonton Unihockey/Floorball League
Oil Country FC
River City IBK

External links
Edmonton Floorball Association

Canadian floorball teams
Night
2007 establishments in Alberta
Sports clubs established in 2007